The North Coast Regional Botanic Garden in Coffs Harbour is a 20 hectare oasis in the heart of Coffs blending a mix of natural coastal forests, planted gardens, discovery walks and picnic areas. On Hardacre Street just one km from the Coffs Harbour CBD on the Mid North Coast region of New South Wales, Australia.

The gardens are open from 9 am to 5 pm every day of the year. Entry is free.

Features

Entrance Gardens - Prime Display Area 
A miniature botanic garden covering about 1 hectare showcasing the variety of plantings in the garden.

Natural Forest and Mangroves 
Covering about half of the total garden area the native forests and mangroves represents the original native vegetation of the area.

Rare and Endangered 
The North Coast Region of New South Wales contains 17 of the 20 most endangered plant species in New South Wales. The  North Coast Regional Botanic Garden aims to provide a safe area to help ensure the survival of these endangered plants. The garden has a specimen of the endemic swamp orchid (Phaius australis), one of the most endangered plant species in New South Wales.

The Sensory Garden 
Located next to the Rare and Endangered area of the garden near the main entrance, the sensory garden contains a variety of aromatic plants.

The new Glasshouse

Opened in June 2022 the new glasshouse has a tropical house kept at around 32C for plants from tropical climates and a shade house for ferns and other shade loving plants. The glasshouse has a wide variety of orchids, bromeliads, ferns, Anthuriums, Taro and other plants.

Eastern Australian Native Flora 
The Eastern Australian Native Flora contains plants from areas with a similar climate to Coffs Harbour. These are mostly from the north coast heathland, coastal areas of New South Wales and sections of Queensland with a climate similar to Coffs harbour.

Exotic Collection 
The exotic collection contains plants from overseas with a similar climate to Coffs Harbour, mostly from regions approximately 30 degrees north or south of the equator.

Rainforest 
The Rainforest area was planted in 1987 and contains about 350 species.

Japanese Friendship Garden 
The Japanese friendship garden was constructed with advice from gardeners from the Botanic Gardens in Sasebo, Coffs Harbour's sister city in Japan.

Facilities 

Picnic areas, a mangrove board walk, sensory gardens, toilets, glass houses and wheelchair access.

The gardens have tranquil grassy areas and garden beds of plants from many parts of the world.  A special feature is the plantings of rare rainforest trees from northern New South Wales. Supervised by the eminent Australian botanist, Alexander Floyd

See also
 List of botanical gardens

References

External links 

https://coffsbotanicgarden.com.au

Botanical gardens in New South Wales
1980 establishments in Australia
Mid North Coast